Edgar Luis Berlanga Jr. (born May 18, 1997) is an American professional boxer.

Early life
Berlanga was born to the large Nuyorican community of Brooklyn, to parents from Puerto Rico. He started boxing at the age of 7, As a child, he was a fan of Félix Trinidad, a former world champion who frequently fought at Madison Square Garden. When queried about his heritage, Berlanga responded “I feel a hundred percent Puerto Rican [...] I was born over there, but belong here. I am very Puerto Rican”. He also emphasized that most of his family still resides on the island, and that when he boxes he represents them and its "beautiful flag.".

Amateur career
Berlanga began boxing at the age of seven, gathering an amateur record of 162-17.

Professional career

Early career 
He made his professional debut on April 29, 2016, scoring a first-round knockout (KO) victory against Jorge Pedroza at Isla San Marcos in Aguascalientes City, Mexico. He has gone on to compile a record of 17-0, with all but one of his wins coming by first-round stoppage.

By late 2020, Berlanga's record had improved to 16–0, with all of his victories coming in the 1st round, catching the attention of media as he was closing in on the official world record for consecutive 1st-round KOs held by Ali Raymi.  On December 12, 2020, he equalled Young Otto's record when he knocked out Ulises Sierra in the first round.

His attempt to capture the world record for consecutive 1st-round KOs ended on April 24, 2021 when he was taken the full distance in his unanimous decision victory against Demond Nicholson in his 17th pro fight.

On October 9, 2021 on the undercard of Tyson Fury vs. Deontay Wilder III, Berlanga overcame a knockdown in the ninth round against former WBO title challenger Marcelo Esteban Coceres to attain his eighteenth successive professional victory. He won via unanimous decision with all three scorecards reading 96–93.

Berlanga attracted controversy due to an incident during his June 11, 2022 fight against Roamer Alexis Angulo, during which Berlanga attempted to bite Angulo on the shoulder. The incident was not noticed at the time by referee Ricky Gonzales. Berlanga went on to win the fight by unanimous decision. The following day Berlanga joked about the incident saying "I was about to do a Mike Tyson on him". Berlanga received criticism for this comment and later apologized. The New York State Athletic Commission later fined Berlanga $10,000 and suspended him from professional boxing for a period of six months for the incident.

Professional boxing record

References

External links

1997 births
Living people
American male boxers
Puerto Rican male boxers
Boxers from New York City
Sportspeople from Brooklyn
Super-middleweight boxers